Fernand Henri Jean Cournollet (19 December 1882 – 10 August 1971) was a French curler. He was born in Villers-sur-Mer. He won a bronze medal at the 1924 Winter Olympics in Chamonix.

References

External links

1882 births
1971 deaths
People from Villers-sur-Mer
French male curlers
Olympic curlers of France
Olympic bronze medalists for France
Curlers at the 1924 Winter Olympics
Medalists at the 1924 Winter Olympics
Sportspeople from Calvados (department)
20th-century French people